The W-League Golden Boot is an annual football (soccer) award presented to the leading goalscorer in the Australian A-League Women.

The W-League was established in 2008 as the top tier of women's football in Australia. The award is given to the top-scorer over the regular season (not including the finals series). The inaugural award was won by Leena Khamis of Sydney FC, who also scored the fewest to win with seven.

Michelle Heyman, Kate Gill and Sam Kerr have each won the award twice. England's Jodie Taylor was the first non-Australian to have won the award.

Winners

Awards won by club

See also

 List of sports awards honoring women
 A-League Women records and statistics
 Julie Dolan Medal

Notes

References

A-League Women trophies and awards
Australia Women
A-League Women lists
Women's association football trophies and awards